Tilly’s Pony Tails is a series of children’s books, published by Orion Children’s Books in the United Kingdom. The series was created by equestrian sportswoman Pippa Funnell.

Series

The first two books in the series, Magic Spirit and Red Admiral, were first published in May 2009. The series has now been extended to eighteen titles in all. The first four titles have also been recorded as unabridged audiobooks, read by sports presenter Clare Balding.

Characters

The central character, Tilly Redbrow, is an adopted child, who is passionate about everything to do with horses and ponies. In the first book in the series, Magic Spirit, Tilly helps rescue a neglected horse called Magic Spirit. She discovers that she has a special gift for communicating with horses. When she helps Magic Spirit, Tilly meets Angela, who owns a stables called Silver Shoe Farm. Angela invites Tilly to spend time at Silver Shoe Farm, learning about riding, training and caring for horses. Tilly soon makes friends at the stables and spends all her free time there. Each title in the series tells a new story about Tilly’s adventures with horses and ponies that she comes into contact with, as well as her continuing relationship with Magic Spirit. The series is also linked with a continuing story about Tilly’s background and birth, the only clue to which is a bracelet made of horsehair. As well as the fictional story, each title also contains a tips section with expert advice from Pippa Funnell on all aspects of horses and ponies.

Author

Pippa Funnell, MBE, is a leading equestrian sportswoman in three-day eventing. In 2003 she became the first person and currently the only person to win eventing's greatest prize, the Rolex Grand Slam of eventing (consecutive wins at Kentucky, Badminton  Horse Trials and Burghley Horse Trials). As part of the British team, she won a silver medal in the 2000 Sydney Olympics, a bronze medal at the 2002 World Equestrian Games and silver again at the 2004 Athens Olympics. Pippa Funnell is a trustee of the horse charity, World Horse Welfare, and the work of the charity features throughout the Tilly's Pony Tails books.

Titles

Novels
 Magic Spirit 
 Red Admiral 
 Rosie 
 Samson 
 Lucky Chance 
 Solo 
 Pride and Joy 
 Neptune 
 Parkview Pickle 
 Nimrod 
 Moonshadow 
 Autumn Glory 
 Goliath 
 Buttons 
 Rusty 
 Royal Flame

Audiobooks
(read by Clare Balding)
 Magic Spirit 
 Red Admiral 
 Rosie 
 Samson

Special editions
 Tilly’s Horse box 
 Tilly's Pony Tails 1-3

External links
 Tilly's Pony Tails Official Series website
 Tilly’s Pony Tails on the Orion Publishing Group website

Series of children's books
British children's novels
Pony books